Gordon Andrew Minkley (born 2 October 1936) is a former cricketer who played first-class cricket for Border from 1962 to 1971.

Minkley was an opening and middle-order batsman who achieved little in his first season, 1962–63. He did not play again for Border until 1967–68, when he was appointed captain, a position he held for the remainder of his career. His only fifty was also his only century: 135 in an innings victory over Griqualand West in 1969–70.

He is one of the three honorary life vice-presidents of Border Cricket.

References

External links

1936 births
Living people
South African cricketers
Border cricketers
Sportspeople from Qonce